Torrent Cables Limited was incorporated on March 22, 1991. It was an Indian cable manufacturing company based in Ahmedabad. Its key products and provided services included XLPE Cables (HT), XLPE Cables (LT), PVC cables, with other manufacturing goods, sale of services, scrap, etc.

Torrent Cables Limited was the first company in the cable industry to get ISO 9001:2000 certification. The majority of its manufactured products are BIS certified and generally comply with the IEC standards. Many industrial sectors, including petrochemicals, fertilizers and chemicals, energy, cement, steel and aluminum, ports, railways, infrastructure, engineering and construction, fast-moving consumer goods, information technology, and aerospace were served by the company.

Torrent Cables merged with Torrent Power in 2015.

References

External links
 Torrent Group

Manufacturing companies based in Ahmedabad
Companies established in 1983
Wire and cable manufacturers
Indian brands
Torrent Group
Indian companies established in 1983
1983 establishments in Gujarat
Companies listed on the National Stock Exchange of India
Companies listed on the Bombay Stock Exchange